Perry Richards (January 14, 1934 – July 16, 2008) was an American football end. He played for the Pittsburgh Steelers in 1957, Detroit Lions in 1958, Chicago / St. Louis Cardinals from 1959 to 1960, Buffalo Bills in 1961 and for the New York Titans in 1962.

References

1934 births
2008 deaths
American football ends
Detroit Titans football players
Pittsburgh Steelers players
Detroit Lions players
Chicago Cardinals players
St. Louis Cardinals (football) players
Buffalo Bills players
New York Jets players